Beason is an unincorporated census-designated place (CDP) in Oran Township, Logan County, Illinois, United States. The town lies one mile (1.6 km) south of Illinois Route 10. At the 2010 census, Beason had a population of 189. Beason has a post office with ZIP code 62512.

History
Beason was established on July 29, 1872, by Silas Beason, for whom the town is named. It was founded as a stop on the Havana, Lincoln, and Eastern Railroad, which is now a branch of the Illinois Central Railroad. The first store in Beason was a grocery opened by Berryman H. Pendleton, who later became Beason's first postmaster. Beason's school was built in 1893 and its Methodist church was built in 1904.

Demographics

As of the 2020 census, Beason has a population of 147.

Race 
146 people are white, 1 person is Hispanic or Latino, and 1 person is black.

2009 murders
In September 2009, five members of the Gee family were murdered in their home in Beason. Investigators said that all five died of blunt force trauma.

On May 31, 2013, Christopher Harris, the former husband of the Gees' oldest daughter, was convicted of murdering them and the attempted murder of the family's three-year-old daughter, among other crimes committed during the murders. Harris was given five life sentences for the crimes. His brother, Jason, who eventually admitted being outside the house that night, then testified to what he heard and saw outside the home during the murders, including Christopher entering the house with a tire iron that was consistent with the weapon used on all six victims. Jason received a 20-year sentence for obstruction of justice. Before Jason's testimony, Christopher had admitted to being at the house but had tried to make a case that he was a hero who walked in on the family's teenage son, Dillen, murdering his family and killed the teen in self-defense.

References

External links
History of Beason, Il.
NACo

Census-designated places in Logan County, Illinois
Census-designated places in Illinois
Unincorporated communities in Illinois
Populated places established in 1872
1872 establishments in Illinois